Eoophyla platyxantha is a moth in the family Crambidae. It was described by David John Lawrence Agassiz in 2012. It is found in Cameroon and the Democratic Republic of the Congo.

The wingspan is 14–17 mm. The forewings are white with a pale yellow antemedian fascia and a fuscous spot on the costa. The base of the hindwings is white with a yellow antemedian fascia and a white median area, as well as an orange-yellow postmedian fascia.

Etymology
The species name refers to the hindwing markings and is derived from Greek platus (meaning broad) and xanthos (meaning yellow).

References

Eoophyla
Moths described in 2012